Nageotte (/nəˈʒɒt/) is a French surname related to the places named Nageot. It may refer to the following notable people:

Aleth Guzman-Nageotte (1904–1978), French sculptor and medalist
Clint Nageotte (born 1980), American baseball pitcher
Jean Nageotte (1866–1948), French neuroanatomist known for the Babinski–Nageotte syndrome
Katie Nageotte (born 1991), American pole vaulter

References

French-language surnames